Arnold I (b. about 1045 - d. about 1125), Count of Loon (Looz) from about 1079, son of Emmo, Count of Loon, and Suanhildis, daughter of Dirk III, Count of Holland, and his wife Othelandis.

He was an ally of Henry of Verdun and Otbert, both bishops of Liège. In 1078, he endowed the collegiate churches of Huy and of St. John at Liège.

In 1088, he negotiated at the request of Bishop Henry of Verdun to end a conflict in the abbey of Sint-Truiden where the bishop and emperor Henry IV had appointed rival abbots. As a result of his diplomacy, the emperor transferred the authority of the abbey from Henry I, Duke of Lower Lorraine, to Arnold. Arnold forced Henry and his ally Godfrey of Bouillon, to withdraw from the monastery. 

The domain of Arnold expanded with the County of Rieneck by his marriage to Agnes of Mainz, daughter of Gerhard I, Count of Rieneck, and Helwig von Bliescastel.  Sources disagree on their number of children, but they are believed to include:
 Arnold II, Count of Looz. He is distinguished from his father of the same name by historians who note records for counts named Arnold or Arnulf between 1179 and 1141, which seems too long to be one person. The first Arnold must have died between 1125 when Count Arnold appears in a record with his son also named Arnold, and 1135, when a new Count Arnold appears with his own son and successor Louis.
 Gertrude van Loon (1100–1154), married to Hugo XI, Count of Dagsburg. Their son was Hugo XII, Count of Dagsburg, who married Luitgarde, widow of Godfrey II, Count of Louvain.  She was  daughter of Berengar II of Sulzbach, and sister of Gertrude von Sulzbach, wife of Conrad III of Germany, and Bertha, wife of Manuel I Comnenus, the emperor of Byzantium. Their granddaughter was Gertrude of Dagsburg, wife of Theobald I, King of Navarre.
 Agnes van Loon (born c. 1100), married Gerhard IV, Count of Jülich
 Beatrix van Loon (died after 1132), married Arnout III, Count of Aarschot and had issue.

Another son, Gerard, did not exist. He appears in older books such as the oldest edition of Belgian National Biographies, based upon a charter of 1101. Baerten (1969 p.40 footnote 2) describes this as a mistake caused by modern edition with a wrongly placed comma, and gives references to the literature. While the confusion about the non-existent "Gerard" remains, Arnold is now understood to have been succeeded by his son Arnold as Count of Looz upon his death.

Sources 

J.-J. Thonissen, "Arnoul Ier et Arnoul II", Biographie nationale de Belgique, vol. 1 (Brussels, 1866) link
Vanderlinden, H., "Le tribunal de la paix de Henri de Verdun (1082) et la transformation de la principauté de Liège", in Mélanges Henri Pirenne, 1926
Baerten, Jean (1969), Het Graafschap Loon (11de – 14de eeuw) (PDF)

External links
Medieval Lands Project, Comtes de Looz
Medieval Lands Project, Grafen von Egisheim und Dagsburg (Moha)

Belgian nobility
House of Loon